Black Socialists in America (BSA) is an American socialist political group that organizes predominantly among black working-class people and whose stated goal is to create a national platform and network for those who identify as Black American socialists. 

Since its foundation, the group has worked on grassroots initiatives with organizations across the country, received national media coverage and an endorsement from Noam Chomsky.

The group has also hosted a number of public panels and discussions featuring both civil rights era and radical black leaders such as Jamal Joseph. Members of the group acting on behalf of the organization have also been represented in a number of other lectures or interviews done by figures such as economist Richard D. Wolff, and television networks like Free Speech TV.

See also 
 African-American socialism
 American Left
 Labor history of the United States
 Marxism

Notes

References 

2018 establishments in the United States
African-American socialism
Anti-racist organizations in the United States
Socialist organizations in the United States